Gábor Csalog (born 1960 in Budapest) is a Hungarian pianist.

He was trained at the Ferenc Liszt Academy, and completed studies under György Sebõk at Indiana University. He was prized at the 1986 Ferenc Liszt Competition.

Csalog, known for his work on Hungarian contemporary music, has recorded for Budapest Music Records since the '90s. His recordings include Étrangeté / Strangeness Alexander Scriabin: Preludes and Poems (Budapest Music Center Records, 2005). He is a teacher at the Liszt Academy and the Béla Bartók Conservatory, and currently works on an Urtext edition of Fryderyk Chopin's complete works for Könemann Music Budapest.

External links
 Official Website https://gaborcsalog.com  
 Budapest Music Records
 Budapest Festival Orchestra

Hungarian classical pianists
Male classical pianists
1960 births
Living people
21st-century classical pianists
21st-century Hungarian male musicians